This article is about the particular significance of the decade 1880–1889 to Wales and its people.

Incumbents
Prince of Wales – Albert Edward
Princess of Wales – Alexandra
Archdruid of the National Eisteddfod of Wales – Clwydfardd

Events
1880
1881
1882
1883
1884
1885
1886
1887
1888
1889

Arts and literature

Awards
National Eisteddfod of Wales 
1880 – Caernarfon
1881 – Merthyr Tydfil
Chair – Evan Rees ("Dyfed")
Crown – Watkin Hezekiah Williams
1882 – Denbigh
Chair – withheld
Crown – Dafydd Rees Williams
1883 – Cardiff
Chair – withheld
Crown – Anna Walter Thomas
1884 – Liverpool
Chair – Evan Rees ("Dyfed")
Crown – Edward Foulkes
1885 – Aberdare
Chair – Watkin Hezekiah Williams
Crown – Griffith Tecwyn Parry
1886 – Caernarfon
Chair – Richard Davies
Crown – John Cadfan Davies
1887 – London
Chair – Robert Arthur Williams
Crown – John Cadfan Davies
1888 – Wrexham
Chair – Thomas Tudno Jones
Crown – Howell Elvet Lewis
1889 – Brecon
Chair – Evan Rees
Crown – Howell Elvet Lewis

New books
Rhoda Broughton – Doctor Cupid (1886)
Richard Davies (Mynyddog) – Pedwerydd Llyfr Mynyddog (1882)
Amy Dillwyn
The Rebecca Rioter (1880)
Jill and Jack(1887)
Daniel Silvan Evans – Dictionary of the Welsh Language (Geiriadur Cymraeg) (1887)
Frances Hoggan – Education for Girls in Wales (1882)
Daniel Owen
Y Dreflan (1881)
Rhys Lewis (1885)
Robert Williams (Trebor Mai) – Gwaith Barddonol Trebor Mai (1883)

Sport
1881 – Welsh Rugby Union is formed.
1884 – The Cardiff Arms Park hosts its first rugby international (between Wales and Ireland).
1889 – In a football match between Wales and Scotland at Wrexham, the referee allows the injured Welsh goalkeeper to be replaced – the first ever substitution in a soccer match.

Births
1880
30 April – George Maitland Lloyd Davies, pacifist (died 1949)
9 May – Thomas Scott-Ellis, 8th Baron Howard de Walden, patron of the arts (died 1946)
11 May – David Davies, 1st Baron Davies, politician (died 1944)
22 June – Rhys Gabe, rugby player (died 1967)
2 September – Isaac Daniel Hooson, poet (died 1948)
15 September – William Charles Williams, VC recipient (died 1915)
date unknown
Edward Tegla Davies, author (died 1967)
Harry Grindell Matthews, inventor (died 1941)
1881
3 January – Lewis Pugh Evans, VC recipient (died 1962)
14 February – William John Gruffydd, academic and politician (died 1954)
16 April – Ifor Williams, academic (died 1965)
5 May – Rupert Price Hallowes, VC recipient (died 1915)
16 June – David Grenfell, politician (died 1968)
20 June – John Crichton-Stuart, 4th Marquess of Bute, landowner (died 1947)
August – John Lewis, footballer (died 1954)
30 September – Philip Lewis Griffiths, lawyer (died 1945)
28 October – Edward Evans, 1st Baron Mountevans, explorer (died 1957)
December – George Hall, politician (died 1965)
date unknown
David Thomas ("Afan"), composer (died 1928)
Robert Williams, trade union leader
1882
24 July – Reginald Clarry, politician (died 1945)
6 November – David Rees Griffiths, poet (died 1953)
16 December – Cyril Fox, archaeologist (died 1967)
date unknown – Ivor Lewis, artist (died 1958)
1883
30 April – David John de Lloyd, composer (died 1948)
28 May – Clough Williams-Ellis, architect (died 1978)
13 September – Percy Thomas, architect (died 1969)
date unknown
John Jones (Tydu), poet (died 1968)
James Walker, politician
1884
19 February – Clement Davies, politician (died 1962)
24 November – Jack Jones, novelist (died 1970)
date unknown
Arthur Jenkins, politician (died 1946)
Thomas Jones, footballer (died 1958)
1885
2 August – Clarence Bruce, 3rd Baron Aberdare (died 1957)
21 November –  Robert Evans, footballer (died 1965)
date unknown
Ernest Evans, politician (died 1965)
David John Williams, writer and politician (died 1970)
1886
28 March – John Osborn Williams, entrepreneur (died 1963)
3 May – Morgan Jones, Welsh politician (died 1939)
29 September – Jack Williams, VC recipient (died 1953)
1887
13 January – Hedd Wyn, poet (died 1917)
27 February – James Dickson Innes, painter (died 1914)
date unknown
Huw Menai, poet (died 1961)
1888
21 May – William Cove, politician (died 1963)
16 August – T. E. Lawrence, writer and war hero (died 1935)
19 October – Peter Freeman, politician (died 1956)
5 September – Rhys Hopkin Morris, politician (died 1956)
1889
1 February – John Lewis, philosopher (died 1976)
11 December – Cedric Morris, artist (died 1982)

Deaths
1880
23 April – Robert Thomas (Ap Vychan), minister and writer (b. 1809)
1881
20 April – William Burges, architect
20 November – Hugh Owen, educationist (born 1804)
1882
August – John Dillwyn Llewelyn, botanist and photographer (born 1810)
16 December – Alfred Ollivant, Bishop of Llandaff (born 1798)
1883
8 November – William Rees (Gwilym Hiraethog), poet (born 1802)
1884
17 March – Edward Lloyd-Mostyn, 2nd Baron Mostyn (born 1795)
24 May – Henry Thomas Edwards, preacher (born 1837)
6 November – George Vane-Tempest, 5th Marquess of Londonderry, industrialist
1885
1 May – Henry Brinley Richards, composer (born 1817)
1 August – Sidney Gilchrist Thomas, inventor (born 1850)
1886
31 March – Edward Douglas-Pennant, 1st Baron Penrhyn (born 1800)
1887
25 January – Rowland Prichard, musician (born 1811)
23 April – John Ceiriog Hughes, poet (born 1832)
19 July – Lewis Edwards, educationist (born 1809)
1888
20 August – Henry Richard, politician and peace campaigner (born 1812)
1889
21 January – Joshua Hughes, Bishop of St Asaph (born 1807)
8 June – Gerard Manley Hopkins, Anglo-Welsh poet (born 1844)
date unknown  – John Hughes, industrialist (in St Petersburg)